Pervert! is a 2005 American comedy horror film directed by Jonathan Yudis. It is mainly a tribute to the films of Russ Meyer.

Plot
College student James (Andrews) arrives from New Orleans at a desert ranch owned by his father, Hezekiah (Sandeen) to help out. Soon after arriving, James is hit on by Hezekiah's wife, Cheryl (Carey), and starts having nightmares. James and Cheryl are caught by Hezekiah having sex, Cheryl and Hezekiah have a fight, then she leaves the ranch that night.

Hezekiah drives into town and picks up another woman, Alisha (Sally Jean), who also quickly falls for James then disappears. Cheryl staggers into Hezekiah's "studio" (an art workshop where he makes female body sculptures out of meat), and dies in front of James. He takes her into the house, where he finds his father crying over Alisha's dead body.

James calls a care facility because he thinks his dad has gone crazy. They send out a nurse, Patty (Clarke), who handcuffs Hezekiah to his bed so that the next time somebody is killed, he can be eliminated as a suspect. In the few days of waiting for the next victim to show up, Patty and James decide to while away the time by having sex.

James reveals to Patty that he went to a witch doctor (Johnson) back in New Orleans to help him with attracting females but was misled; his penis can now detach itself from his body and kill people.

A side story involves a sexually confused local mechanic (Yudis, the film's producer and director) and his probably intentional delay in fixing James's car, in order to seduce him.

Cast

Sean Andrews as James
Darrell Sandeen as Hezekiah
Juliette Clarke as Patty
Sally Jean as Alisha
Mary Carey as Cheryl
Jonathan Yudis as Mechanic
Tula as Hitchhiker
Candice Hussain as Marissa
Malik Carter as Narrator
Edmund Johnson as Witch Doctor
Lucia as Montage Babe
Aurelie Sanchez as Coyote
William Yudis as Baby Mechanic
Jason Consoli as Frat Boy
Andy Curtain as Frat Boy
John Brotherton as Frat Boy
Derek Berg as College Student
Ren Trostle as College Student
Ryan Johnsen as College Student
Demetrius Markus as College Student
Victoria Bakshi|Victoria Yudis as Dazzling Woman
Stephanie Jane Markham as Additional voices

Release
In the French version of the DVD, another short film titled Bloody Current Exchange by the French director Romain Basset is included as a hidden bonus. The film is part of the "Boobs and Blood Festival" in September 2010 in California.

References

External links 

 
 

2005 films
2005 horror films
2005 comedy horror films
American sexploitation films
2000s sex comedy films
American sex comedy films
American erotic horror films
American comedy horror films
2000s English-language films
2000s American films
Films about witch doctors
Films set on farms